Wallpaper for the Soul is the second studio album by French indie pop band Tahiti 80, released on Minty Fresh in 2002. It peaked at number 86 on the CMJ Radio 200 chart. As of 2003, it has sold 130,000 copies worldwide.

Critical reception
At Metacritic, which assigns a weighted average score out of 100 to reviews from mainstream critics, the album received an average score of 71% based on 10 reviews, indicating "generally favorable reviews".

Todd Kristel of AllMusic gave the album 4 stars out of 5, saying: "More fully realized and bolstered with a stronger song selection than its predecessor, Wallpaper for the Soul is a well-crafted collection of infectious tunes that won't necessarily stick with you for years to come, but should be quite enjoyable while you're listening."

Track listing

Personnel
Credits adapted from liner notes.

Musicians
 Xavier – vocals, guitar, bass guitar, saxophone, synthesizer, mellotron, electric piano, organ, bells, drums
 Mederic – guitar, background vocals
 Pedro – synthesizer, bass guitar, programming
 Sylvain – synthesizer, mellotron, drums, conga
 Eric Matthews – piano, trumpet
 Bob Hoffnar – pedal steel guitar
 Andy Chase – human beat box, background vocals
 Urban Soul Orchestra – horns, flute, strings

Technical personnel
 Tahiti 80 – production
 Andy Chase – production, engineering
 Richard Hewson – arrangement
 Tony Lash – mixing
 Scott Hull – mastering
 Elisabeth Arkhipoff – artwork
 Laurent Fetis – artwork
 Stephane Milon – photography

Charts

References

External links
 
 

2002 albums
Tahiti 80 albums